Thomas John Peter Eyre (born 17 October 1939) is a former English cricketer who played for Derbyshire between 1959 and 1972.

Eyre was born at Brough, Derbyshire. He started playing for the Derbyshire second XI in 1955 and made his first-class debut against Cambridge University in the 1959 season, before his County Championship debut against Surrey two months later. He took a wicket in each match. From the 1960 season he continued playing regularly for both the first and second teams.

Eyre played more first team games in the 1961 season and took two 5 wicket innings in 1961 against Essex and Lancashire. However, in the 1962 season he spent more time in the second XI. In the 1964 season he took 5 for 15 against Leicestershire. He took 5 for 42 against Warwickshire in the 1967 season and in the 1968 season took 5–31 against Glamorgan and 5 for 57 against Northamptonshire. His best season was in 1969 when he achieved his best bowling figures of 8–65 against Somerset and his top score of 102 against Leicestershire. He also took 5 for 70 against Glamorgan and was named man of the match in the Gillette Cup semifinal against Sussex. Eyre played his last first-class matches  in the 1972 season but turned out for the second XI in 1973.

Eyre was a right-arm medium-fast bowler and took 359 first-class wickets with an average of 28.70 and a best performance of 8 for 65. He took a further 59 wickets in the one-day game. He was a left-handed batsman and played 264 innings in 197 first-class matches with an average of 15.98 and a top score of 102. He played 32 innings in 41 one-day matches.

References

1939 births
English cricketers
Derbyshire cricketers
Living people